Sealggajávri is a lake in Narvik Municipality in Nordland county, Norway. The ending -jávri is the word for "lake" in the Northern Sami language.

See also
List of lakes in Norway

References

Narvik
Lakes of Nordland